Macaranga taitensis is a species of plant in the family Euphorbiaceae. It is endemic to French Polynesia.

References

Flora of French Polynesia
taitensis
Near threatened plants
Taxonomy articles created by Polbot
Plants described in 1865